Malizna is a monotypic genus of African jumping spiders containing the single species, Malizna admirabilis. It was first described by Wanda Wesołowska in 2021.

See also
 List of Salticidae genera

References

Monotypic Salticidae genera
Taxa named by Wanda Wesołowska
Spiders of Africa